Oregon Ballot Measure 1 (1962) was a ballot measure in the U.S. State of Oregon in 1962. It was a constitutional amendment affecting the state militia of Oregon, the Oregon National Guard. The measure changed the constitutional language outlining the organization of the state militia.

References

Military in Oregon
1962 Oregon ballot measures